Reginald Walter Boreham (27 May 1896–1976) was an English footballer who played in the Football League for Arsenal and Notts County.

References

1896 births
1976 deaths
English footballers
Association football forwards
English Football League players
Wycombe Wanderers F.C. players
Arsenal F.C. players
Notts County F.C. players